Kim Kold (born 25 August 1965) is a Danish actor and former professional bodybuilder. Standing 6'4" (1.93 m) tall and weighing 320 lbs (155 kg), he is primarily known for his role as Owen Shaw's crew member Klaus in Fast & Furious 6.

Early life
Born in Copenhagen, Kold played around 150 football matches as a goalkeeper in the lower leagues until he suffered from an injury at the age of 27. He was sent to the gym for rehabilitation training, where he took up an interest in bodybuilding.

Career

Bodybuilding
Kold started competing in 1997.  He won the Danish National Bodybuilding Championship in 2006.

Acting
Kold was persuaded by his friend, film director Mads Matthiesen, to play the title role in Matthiesen's short film Dennis (2007). The film was not promoted, but soon became popular and made Kold a name as an actor. He reprised the role of Dennis when Matthiesen made Teddy Bear (2012), a feature-length adaptation of Dennis. He appeared in Fast & Furious 6 (2013), as well as Polish short film Smok (2015), based on the legend of Wawel Dragon. In 2016 he appeared the film Star Trek Beyond as well as the film 6 Underground in 2019.

Other ventures
Kold worked as a locksmith in Denmark for several years during his bodybuilding career. He owns his own security business in Puerto Banús.

Filmography

References

External links
 

Danish male actors
Danish bodybuilders
Living people
1965 births